The Syracuse and Onondaga Railroad was chartered in Syracuse, New York, on May 13, 1836, and was granted approval by the State to build a road from Syracuse to local quarries in Split Rock, New York.

The road was incorporated on the same day as the Syracuse Stone Railroad which was organized for the same purpose. Both roads were consolidated before the construction of the road was complete on October 16, 1838.

References

Defunct railroads in Syracuse, New York
Defunct New York (state) railroads
Railway companies established in 1836
Railway companies disestablished in 1838
1836 establishments in New York (state)
1838 disestablishments in New York (state)
American companies disestablished in 1838
American companies established in 1836